Solveig Ward is an electrical engineer from Quanta Technology in Raleigh, North Carolina.

Awards and honors 

 2014 - Named a Fellow of the Institute of Electrical and Electronics Engineers (IEEE) for her contributions to power system protective relaying, communications systems, and teleprotection.
 2020 - IEEE Charles Proteus Steinmetz Award

References 

Fellow Members of the IEEE
Living people
21st-century American engineers
Year of birth missing (living people)